Red Lake Nation College is a public tribal land-grant community college on the Red Lake Indian Reservation in Red Lake, Minnesota. It is fully accredited by the Higher Learning Commission and enrolls about 150 students. The college is supported by elders and community members who speak the Anishinaabe language and who understand the history of the Red Lake Nation.

Partnerships
RLNC is a member of the American Indian Higher Education Consortium (AIHEC), which is a community of tribally and federally chartered institutions working to strengthen tribal nations and make a lasting difference in the lives of American Indians and Alaska Natives. RLNC was created in response to the higher education needs of American Indians. RLNC generally serves geographically isolated populations that have no other means accessing education beyond the high school level.

References

External links

Two-year colleges in the United States
Educational institutions established in 1987
Education in Beltrami County, Minnesota
American Indian Higher Education Consortium
Community colleges in Minnesota
1987 establishments in Minnesota